Sir Edward Abney (6 February 1631 – 3 January 1727/28) was an English politician.

Abney was born in Newton, Leicestershire, the son of James Abney of Willesley, then in Derbyshire, now in Leicestershire, who had been Sheriff of Derbyshire in 1656. His younger brother was Thomas Abney, later Sir Thomas Abney, Sheriff and Lord Mayor of London. Edward was educated at Ashby School, Measham school and Christ's College, Cambridge, where he graduated BA in 1652–3. He was a Fellow of Christ's College from 1655 to 1661. Knighted in 1673, he served as MP for Leicester Borough from 1690 to 1698.

He married twice. His first wife, Damaris Andrewes, was the daughter of Thomas Andrewes (died 1653), a London merchant, son of Sir Thomas Andrewes (died 1659), Commonwealth Lord Mayor of London. Her mother was Damaris Cradock, daughter of Matthew Cradock (died 1641), first Governor of the Massachusetts Bay Company. At the time of their marriage in 1661 Damaris Andrewes was the stepdaughter of the philosopher Ralph Cudworth, Master of Christ's College, Cambridge, of which Abney was until that year a Fellow. With Damaris, he had a son and three daughters. His second wife was Judith, daughter and coheiress of Peter Barr, merchant, of London, with whom he had two sons. His estate was left to Thomas, the younger son of his second marriage, the elder being considered insane.

He was blind for the last twenty years of his life, dying in 1727 or 1728.

References

1631 births
1728 deaths
People from Ashby-de-la-Zouch
Alumni of Christ's College, Cambridge
Fellows of Christ's College, Cambridge
English MPs 1690–1695
English MPs 1695–1698